The Rivière Cyriac (also The Cyriac) is a freshwater tributary feeding the Kenogami Lake, flowing in:
 Capitale-Nationale: in the unorganized territory of Lac-Pikauba, in the MRC of Charlevoix Regional County Municipality;
 Saguenay-Lac-Saint-Jean: in the unorganized territory of Lac-Ministuk, in the Le Fjord-du-Saguenay Regional County Municipality.

The Cyriac River crosses the Laurentides Wildlife Reserve. The Cyriac river valley is directly served by the route 175; other secondary forest roads have been developed in the sector for forestry and recreational tourism activities.

Forestry is the primary economic activity in the sector; recreational tourism, second.

The surface of the Cyriac River is usually frozen from the end of November to the beginning of April, however the safe circulation on the ice is generally done from mid-December to the end of March.

Geography 
The main watersheds near the Cyriac river are:
 north side: Kenogami Lake, Jean-Guy stream, rivière aux Sables, Saguenay River;
 east side: Simoncouche River, Simoncouche Lake, Bras Sec, rivière du Moulin, Bras de Jacob;
 south side: Pikauba River, Pikauba Lake, Verchères lake, Philippe stream, Jacques-Cartier River;
 west side: Ministuk lake, Gilbert River, Pikauba River.

The Cyriac river rises at Lake Pikauba (). Enclosed between the mountains, this lake has two outlets: the Cyriac river (north side) and the Pikauba river (southeast side where a dam has been built). The north mouth of Pikauba Lake is located at:
  north of the second mouth of the lake;
  north-east of route 175;
  south-east of the upper course of the Petite rivière Pikauba;
  south-east of the confluence of the Cyriac River and Kenogami Lake.

Upper course of the Cyriac river (segment of )

  towards the northwest by forming a loop towards the east at the beginning of the segment, up to the outlet (coming from the north) of Lac Paquin;
  meandering northwest, crossing Lake Muy and collecting the hay stream discharge (coming from the north-east), up to Beaver Creek (coming from the north);
  to the northwest by collecting the outlet (coming from the northeast) from Lake Sims, to Vermette stream (coming from the east);
  along route 175, first towards the northwest, then north and northwest, and crossing the forest road R0287, up to the confluence of the river Gilbert (from the south);

Lower course of the Cyriac river (segment of )

  north to the outlet of a group of lakes including Petit lac Cyriac;
  towards the north, zigzagging at the start of the segment and along the last  the forest road R0215, to the bridge of the route 175;
  westwards, to the confluence of the Normand River (coming from the south);
  towards the northwest by collecting the Hector stream at the beginning of the segment, by forming a hook toward the northeast and along the west side of the city limit of Saguenay (city) at the end of the segment, up to the confluence of the Jean-Boivin River (coming from the west);
  to the north in a deep valley, along the western side of the city limit of Saguenay (city), to its mouth.

The Cyriac river flows on the south shore of Lake Kénogami, facing Île Verte and facing Baie Voisine de l'Île à Jean-Guy. This confluence is located at:

  west of the confluence of the Simoncouche River and Kenogami Lake;
  north-west of route 175;
  south-west of the barrage de Portage-des-Roches;
  south of downtown Jonquière sector of Saguenay (city);
  south of the confluence of rivière-aux-Sables and Saguenay River;
  south-west of the confluence of the Chicoutimi and Saguenay rivers.

Toponymy 
The name of the river was given in honor of Cyriac Buckell, German settler and trapper, installed on the banks, facing the mouth of this river at the time of the colonization of the territory. He was, moreover, the first settler to settle there.

The toponym "Cyriac River" was formalized on December 5, 1968, at the Place Names Bank of the Commission de toponymie du Québec.

Notes and references

Appendices

Related articles 
 Le Fjord-du-Saguenay Regional County Municipality
 Laurentides Wildlife Reserve
 Jean-Boivin River
 Gilbert River
 Kenogami Lake
 Chicoutimi River
 Saguenay River
 St. Lawrence River
 List of rivers of Quebec

Rivers of Saguenay–Lac-Saint-Jean
Rivers of Capitale-Nationale
Charlevoix Regional County Municipality
Le Fjord-du-Saguenay Regional County Municipality
Laurentides Wildlife Reserve